Margaritis Kastellis (Castellis) (1907–1972
) was a Greek composer and army officer known for his work in military music. His arrangement and adaptation of the Hymn to Liberty for military band is still played Greece today. He was  born in Chrysoupoli (a city in northern Greece) and died in Athens.

Life and career
Kastellis studied under Manolis Kalomiris. He joined the Greek Army at an early age, as a musician, and upon completion of a full career, he left with the rank of Lieutenant-Colonel, having served as Chief Inspector of Military Bands nationwide. After retiring in 1963, he taught for several years at the National Conservatoire. He was an authority on wind instruments (both woodwind and brass, including brass band instruments).

Style

The main features of his music are:
A profound attachment to popular musical tradition.
A marked preference for "freer" form of composition (suite, fantasy) over more "formal" ones (sonata, symphony, concerto), though he was by no means unfamiliar with the latter.
A large part of his scores are to be found at the Thessaloniki University Library (Department of Musical Studies), along with a 2002 thesis Christina Anastassiou.

Selected works

Compositions
For orchestra
Introduction and Round Dance from Epirus
Prelude and Dance from Epirus
Greek Dances (on motives taken from Greek Island tunes)

For military band
Introduction and Round Dance from Epirus
On the Mountain Slopes of Zagori
The Booted Eagle
Thessaly (march)

Chamber music
Little Suite for clarinet and bassoon
Elegy for two clarinets

Piano music
Greek Dances
Little Greek Suite (4 hands)

Songs
Listen to my Secret
The Hazelnut Tree
The Sailor
The Shepherdess' Lover
The Heart of a Woman (for 4 voices)

Arrangements and transcriptions
For Orchestra
Little Lemon Tree
The Zalongo Dance
Vassiliki (Gives the Orders)
Farewell, ye Fair Maids
Lyngos

For Military Band
Hymn to Liberty
Florilège (Songs by Attique)
Prayer (Bortniansky)
Reveille (for the Infantry)
Reveille (for the Artillery)

References

Greek composers
1907 births
1972 deaths
20th-century composers
Military music composers
Military musicians
People from Kavala (regional unit)